Skytop is one of the 26 officially recognized neighborhoods of Syracuse, New York.  It includes Syracuse University's South Campus.

Geography
It borders two other Syracuse neighborhoods: University Neighborhood to the north, and Outer Comstock to the west. It holds Syracuse University's South Campus Housing.

References

Neighborhoods in Syracuse, New York